Isidoor De Ryck (5 September 1926 – 11 January 2009) was a Belgian racing cyclist. He rode in the 1950 Tour de France.

Major results
1950
 1st Overall Tour de Luxembourg
1st Stage 4
1951
 6th Overall Critérium du Dauphiné Libéré
1st Stage 5
1952
 1st Overall Deutschland Tour
 1st Berg-Housse
 4th Overall Volta a Catalunya
1st Stages 5 & 10
1953
 1st Stage 3 Euskal Bizikleta
1955
 6th Omloop Het Volk

References

External links
 

1926 births
2009 deaths
Belgian male cyclists
People from Temse
Cyclists from East Flanders
20th-century Belgian people